Huk may refer to:

People 
 Alexander Huk, American neuroscientist
 Ihor Huk (born 2002), Ukrainian footballer
 Tomáš Huk (born 1994), Slovak footballer
 HuK, former professional Starcraft II player Chris Loranger (born 1989)

Places 
 Huk Formation, a geologic formation in Norway
 Huk, Isfahan, a village in Iran
 Huk, Norway, a beach in Bygdøy, Oslo
 Huk, South Khorasan, a village in Iran
 Zhenetskyi Huk, a waterfall in Ukraine

Arts and entertainment 
 Huk!, a 1956 film set in the Philippines
 Huk (Star Wars), an alien race in Star Wars
 "Huk", a 2015 single by the South Korean girl group Unicorn

Other uses 
 Huk, short for Hukbalahap, a Communist guerrilla movement in the Philippines, or a member of the movement
 HUK, IATA airport code for Hukuntsi Airport, Botswana
 huk, ISO 539-3 code for the Hulung language, an extinct language of Indonesia
 HUK HH-43 Huskie, a United States Navy helicopter
 Hunter-killer Group, a type of anti-submarine formation during World War II